Ludmila Mikaël (born 27 April 1947) is a French actress.

She has appeared in more than eighty films since 1967.

Selected filmography

References

External links
 

1947 births
Living people
French film actresses
French television actresses
French people of Greek descent
French National Academy of Dramatic Arts alumni
Sociétaires of the Comédie-Française
20th-century French actresses
21st-century French actresses
Commandeurs of the Ordre des Arts et des Lettres
People from Bois-Colombes
French stage actresses